The Liceo Torquato Tasso, better known as Liceo Tasso, is one of the oldest secondary schools in Rome, Italy.

References

Schools in Rome
Liceo classico